Nantong University College of Medicine (COM-NT) (former Nantong Medical College-) is located at the end of the Yangtze River, Nantong City, China, 100 km north of Shanghai.

History 
Nantong Medical College, stemmed from a private Medical Institute of Nantong, was founded in 1912 by Zhang Jian. It was one of the earliest medical colleges in China. It was transformed into Nantong Medical College in 1927, and a Medical department of Nantong University (amalgamated from three colleges of agriculture, textile and medicine) in 1928. It was moved to Shanghai In August 1938 and returned home and restored in 1946. During the adjustment of the national higher education in 1952, the medical department was entitled Northern Jiangsu Medical College and renamed as Nantong Medical College in 1956. It came under the joint jurisdiction of China 's Ministry of Transportation and the Jiangsu Provincial Government In 1978. And since Feb. 2002, it has become a college at provincial level. 
COM-NT comprises 19 majors, including the Faculty of Clinical Medicine, Faculty of Preventive Medicine, the Faculty of Pediatrics, the Faculty of Basic Medical Sciences, the Faculty of Nautical Medicine, the Faculty of Radiation, Diagnostic Medicine, and the Faculty of Professional Medical Training. The college has 60 departments, three research institutes, seven affiliated hospitals, and about 70 teaching (clinical training) hospitals and bases.

Schools and departments 
School of Humanities
School of Sciences
School of Law and Politics
School of Business
School of Public Administration
School of Education
School of Foreign Studies
School of Chemistry and Chemical Engineering
School of Life Sciences
School of Mechanical Engineering
School of Electronics and Information
School of Electrical Engineering
School of Computer Science and Technology
School of Architecture Engineering
School of Textile and Clothing
School of Medicine Sciences
School of Public Health
School of Nursing
School of Sports Science
School of Fine Arts and Design
School of Geography
Xinglin School
School of Further Education
Department of Neurosciences
Department of Navigation Medicine.

Merger with Nantong University 
Nantong Medical College merged along with Nantong Institute of Technology and Nantong Teachers College  to form Nantong University on May 18, 2004 . However, it traces its history back to the early twentieth century.

Foreign students 

Specialties for international students are Chinese Language and Literature, History, International Economy and Trade, 
Educational Technology, Administrative Management, Business Administration, Public Administration, Nursing, 
Management of Human Resources, Clinical Medicine (taught in English), Preventive Medicine, Artistic Design, 
Fine Arts, Music, Education (Education for Primary School).

The School of International Education, Nantong University was established in January 2010 and there are around 300 overseas students in the school. As a comprehensive university with a history of over ninety years. Nantong University offers a complete set of disciplines including literature, science, engineering, medicine, pedagogy, economic, law, history, and administration. The university places emphasis on training applied talents. All specialties, especially the specialty of clinic medicine and specialties with a focus on Chinese Culture, tradition and language, are available for international students. NTU is one of the universities which can recruit MBBS students taught in English approved by Ministry of Education of P.R.C. For 17 years, the university has successfully organized Chinese training courses for foreign students.

There are around 145 Indian students, more than 150 Pakistanis and students from Nepal, Namibia, Afghanistan, Germany, Korea, Jordan, Bangladesh, Switzerland, USA, Holland, Australia and Japan.

Location (Aerial view)
 Aerial View of University

See also
Nantong University

References 

Universities and colleges in Jiangsu